The 2023 Tri–Nations Cup is a friendly international association football tournament organised and controlled by the Bangladesh Football Federation (BFF) is scheduled to be played from 22 to 28 March 2023 at Sylhet, Bangladesh.

Participating nations
The FIFA Rankings of participating national teams as of 22 December 2022.

Venue
All three matches will be played in the following venue.

Standings
<onlyinclude>
<onlyinclude>

Matches

Statistics

Goalscorers

References

International association football competitions hosted by Bangladesh
Tri–Nations Cup
2023 in Bangladeshi football